Videna pumila is a species of terrestrial pulmonate gastropod mollusks in the family Trochomorphidae.

This species is endemic to Palau.

References

Fauna of Palau
Videna
Endemic fauna of Palau
Taxonomy articles created by Polbot